Cortin may refer to:

 Cortin, a synonym for corticosteroid
 Cortin, a trade name for the antifungal drug clioquinol